Minuscule 612 (in the Gregory-Aland numbering), α 297 (von Soden), is a Greek minuscule manuscript of the New Testament, on parchment. Palaeographically it has been assigned to the 12th century. The manuscript is lacunose. Formerly it was labeled by 134a and 167p.

Description 

The codex contains the text of the Acts of the Apostles, Catholic epistles, and Pauline epistles on 370 parchment leaves (size ), with lacunae (Acts 1:1-2:47). The lacking text was supplied by a later hand. The text is written in one column per page, 19 lines per page. It contains Prolegomena.

The order of books: Acts, Pauline epistles, and  Catholic epistles. Hebrews is placed after Epistle to Philemon.

Text 

The Greek text of the codex  Aland did not place in any Category.

History 
The manuscript was added to the list of New Testament manuscripts by Johann Martin Augustin Scholz. It was examined by Pasinus. Gregory saw the manuscript in 1886.

The manuscript was destroyed by fire.

The manuscript currently is housed at the Turin National University Library (B. V. 19; 33 folios in B. VI. 43), at Turin.

See also 

 List of New Testament minuscules
 Biblical manuscript
 Textual criticism

References

Further reading 

 W. Reader, Entdeckung von Fregmentem aus zwei zerstörten Minuskeln (338 und 612), Biblica 61, (1980) 407-411.

Greek New Testament minuscules
12th-century biblical manuscripts